The School of International Development (formerly The School of Development Studies) is a department at the University of East Anglia, Norwich, England. Situated within the Faculty of Social Sciences, the School of International Development has been ranked in the top three British development studies departments.

Research centre of excellence
The School of International Development (DEV) was founded in 1973 and along with the Overseas Development Group (ODG) has built a reputation as a centre of excellence for research, teaching and consultancy in international development, within the UK. In the 2008 Research Assessment Exercise (RAE), DEV was ranked in the top three British ‘development studies’ departments, which is a 5-star department using the old RAE 2001 grading method. At the time of the 2008 RAE, all 32 academic staff were included in the RAE, which means that the outcome applies to the whole department.  More than 60 percent of research outputs were considered as ‘world leading’ or ‘internationally excellent’. Within DEV, faculty members work as researchers, consultants and advisers on a wide range of development projects, and their experience feeds back into research and teaching.

DEV undertakes problem-centred research with involvement of end-users to facilitate change, which is guided by the framework of research areas and themes.  DEV has a research reputation in the fields of political ecology, gender, agricultural/rural development and livelihoods, and emerging research profiles in health, HIV/AIDS, climate change mitigation and adaptation, environmental governance, and education and literacy.

DEV publications are located in leading journals, such as Journal of Development Studies, Science, World Development, Journal of South Asian Development, African Affairs, Journal of Human Development and Economic Journal, as well as in books, research reports and working papers. DEV policy impacts are found within key development institutions, such as the Asian Development Bank (ADB), Department for International Development (DFID), Food and Agriculture Organisation (FAO), United Nations Educational, Scientific and Cultural Organisation (UNESCO), United States Agency for International Development (USAID, World Bank, World Health Organization (WHO) and World Wildlife Fund (WWF). DEV has a strong presence in national and international agendas through membership of ESRC panels, DFID committees and key UN policy forums; journal editorial positions, such as co-editor of Global Environment Change and book reviews editor of Journal of South Asian Development; high-level appointments, such as the former President of the Development Studies Association (DSA), Scientific Adviser on two major DEFRA projects on climate impacts and adaptation in China and India, and Vice-Chair of the Scientific and Technical Advisory Panel to the Global Environment Facility; and by attending, presenting at and organising seminars, workshops and conferences. Many faculty are members of the DSA, as well as other professional bodies, such as the International Society for Agricultural Economics.

Overseas Development Group
ODG was founded in 1967 and it has made a significant contribution to international development though consultancy activities and training programmes within and outside the UK. ODG is the institutional mechanism for producing funded research and for policy engagement. All members of DEV faculty belong to ODG and they can generate research and applied work, which is sectoral, cross-themed or through partnerships with other organisations. ODG has 8 research staff working on a variety of projects, including adaptation to climate change in transboundary river basins in Africa; vulnerability and adaptation to natural hazards/disasters and climate change; and conservation, development and livelihoods, with an emphasis on Marine Protected Areas, small islands and climate change.

The ODG 2009 UK-based training courses include:

Climate Change and Development
Gender and Development (Gender and Organisational Change)
Monitoring and Evaluating for Development Activities
Professional Development Programmes

ODG also houses the UK Secretariat Office of the Sustainable Agriculture Innovation Network (SAIN) and the Social Action Research Centre (SARC). SAIN addresses the link between agriculture and climate change in a China-UK partnership on sustainable agriculture and fisheries. SARC is a research, training, consultancy, service and professional development agency. It runs the CBA/DFID Broadcast Media Scheme through a Programme Development Fund and a Travel Bursary Fund to improve and increase coverage of international development on UK mainstream TV.

Notable alumni

Politics & Government
    
Tupou VI, King of Tonga and former Prime Minister of Tonga
José Abel, East Timorese Secretary of State
Yahya Al-Mutawakel, Yemeni Trade Minister
Manuel de Araújo, Member of the Mozambican Assembly
Anil Baijal, Lieutenant Governor of Delhi
Atiqullah Baryalai, Afghan Deputy Defense Minister
Aimé Boji, Democratic Republic of the Congo Budget Minister
Julio Boltvinik, Member of the Mexican Chamber of Deputies
Tony Colman, Labour Member of Parliament
Gino Costa, Peruvian Interior Minister
Cüneyd Düzyol, Turkish Cabinet Minister
Óscar González, Member of the Mexican Chamber of Deputies
Hala Hameed, Maldivian Minister of State
Ousman Jammeh, Gambian Foreign Minister
Asha Abdullah Juma, Member of the Tanzanian National Assembly
Donald Kaberuka, Rwandan Finance Minister and President of the African Development Bank
Murat Karayalçın, Turkish Deputy Prime Minister and Foreign Minister
Manuel Lajo, Member of the Peruvian Congress
Agnes Kwaje Lasuba, South Sudanese Cabinet Minister
Martin Manurung, Member of the Indonesian People's Representative Council
Dee Margetts, Senator for Western Australia
Tito Mboweni, South African Cabinet Minister and Governor of the South African Reserve Bank
Juma Ngasongwa, Tanzanian Trade Minister
Suyoi Osman, Bruneian Education and Health Minister
Murad Qureshi, Member of the London Assembly
Peter Sinon, Seychellois Cabinet Minister
Stone Sizani, Member of the South African National Assembly

Diplomatic Service
Aníbal de Castro, Dominican Republic Ambassador to the United States
Shofry Ghafor, Permanent Representative of Brunei to the United Nations
Arjun Karki, Nepali Ambassador to the United States
Ingebjørg Støfring, Norwegian Ambassador to Bangladesh and Zimbabwe

Other
Patrick J. Bergin, CEO of the African Wildlife Foundation
Carlos Nuno Castel-Branco, Mozambican economist
Rick Caulfield, Chancellor of the University of Alaska Southeast
Gurinder Chadha, film director
Matthew Dunn, MI6 field agent turned author
Mario Luis Fuentes, Director General of the Mexican Social Security Institute
Olivia Graham, Archdeacon of Berkshire
Rosebud Kurwijila, African Union Commissioner
Swinburne Lestrade, Director General of the Organisation of Eastern Caribbean States
Alie Badara Mansaray, Commissioner of the Sierra Leone National Commission for Social Action
Tshediso Matona, CEO of Eskom
Sayed Askar Mousavi, writer and novelist
David Nuyoma, Chairman of the Namibian Stock Exchange and CEO of the Development Bank of Namibia
Maupe Ogun, Nigerian journalist
Mark Seddon, journalist
Michael Shipster, MI6 officer
Primitivo Viray, President of Ateneo de Naga University
Alan Whiteside, UN Commissioner for HIV/AIDS and Governance in Africa
Sally-Ann Wilson, Secretary-General of the Commonwealth Broadcasting Association

Notable faculty

Piers Blaikie, geographer
Ian Livingstone, development economist

References

External links 
The School of International Development, UEA
The Overseas Development Group, UEA

University of East Anglia

zh:东安格里亚大学